A straight flush is a type of poker hand.

Straight flush may also refer to:

 Straight Flush, a B-29 Superfortress
 Straight Flush (book)
 The radar for the 2K12 Kub surface-to-air missile system